Diane Pratte (born 18 June 1953) is a Canadian former alpine skier who competed in the 1972 Winter Olympics.

Pratte's daughter, Brigitte Acton, is also an Olympic alpine skier.

References

1953 births
Living people
Canadian female alpine skiers
Olympic alpine skiers of Canada
Alpine skiers at the 1972 Winter Olympics